Dominica competed at the 2022 Commonwealth Games held in Birmingham, England. This was Dominica's 11th appearance at the Commonwealth Games. 

On 6 July 2022, a team of 11 athletes (eight men and three women) competing in three sports was named by the Dominica Commonwealth Games Association. Dennick Luke and Thea LaFond were the country's flagbearers during the opening ceremony.

Medalists

Competitors
The following is the list of number of competitors participating at the Games per sport/discipline.

Athletics

Dominica's athletics team consisted of five men and two women.

Men
Track and road events

Field events

Women
Field events

Cycling

Dominica entered two male cyclists in the road cycling discipline.

Road
Men

Swimming

Dominica entered one male swimmer. This will mark the country's sport debut in the sport at the Commonwealth Games.

Men

References

External links
Birmingham 2022 Commonwealth Games Official site

2022
Nations at the 2022 Commonwealth Games
2022 in Dominica sport